The 1908–09 Columbia men's ice hockey season was the 13th season of play for the program.

Season
P. E. Locke served as team manager. Despite being one of the earliest universities to support an ice hockey team, Columbia had never achieved much success against collegiate opponents. Owing to this, the incoming class had little enthusiasm for the club which was demonstrated by the lack of candidates for the freshman team. While the freshman squad was eventually compiled, the varsity team finished the season dead last in the IHA.

Note: Columbia University adopted the Lion as its mascot in 1910.

Roster

Standings

Schedule and Results

|-
!colspan=12 style=";" | Regular Season

† some overtime games were not sudden-death and teams played an entire extra period.

Scoring Statistics

Note: Assists were not recorded as a statistic.

References

Columbia Lions men's ice hockey seasons
Columbia
Columbia
Columbia
Columbia